Chemical Society Located in Taipei (CSLT) is a Taiwanese scholarly organization dedicated to chemistry. The organization traces its roots to the establishment of Chinese Chemical Society in Nanjing in 1932 and was reestablished in Taiwan in 1950.  For political reasons, the organization's English name was changed to Chemical Society Located in Taipei although it still retains the name "Chinese Chemical Society" in Chinese.

Publications 
CSLT and Wiley publish a monthly periodical, the Journal of the Chinese Chemical Society.

See also

 Education in Taiwan
 Chinese Chemical Society (Beijing)
 Organic nomenclature in Chinese

References 

1932 establishments in China
1950 establishments in Taiwan
Chemistry societies
Organizations based in Taipei
Science and technology in Taiwan
Scientific organizations established in 1931